Park Island is the largest sports complex in Napier, New Zealand. It hosts clubs and facilities for association football (soccer), cricket, hockey, netball and rugby union. It includes Bluewater Stadium, a multi-purpose stadium that has a capacity of 5,000 people and opened in 1985. The stadium is used mostly for soccer matches and is the home stadium of Napier City Rovers and Hawke's Bay United. It also served as a training venue for teams in the 2011 Rugby World Cup.

External links
 Park Island, Napier City Council

1985 establishments in New Zealand
Association football venues in New Zealand
Buildings and structures in Napier, New Zealand
Sport in Napier, New Zealand
Multi-purpose stadiums in New Zealand
Sports venues in the Hawke's Bay Region